Solomon & Gaenor is a 1999 Welsh film written and directed by Paul Morrison. It stars Ioan Gruffudd as an Orthodox Jewish man named Solomon Levinsky who falls in love with a gentile woman named Gaenor Rees, played by Nia Roberts. They enter into a forbidden love affair, which has tragic consequences. It was filmed twice, once with principal dialogue in English and once with it in Welsh. In the English-language version, there are some scenes in Welsh and in both versions there are scenes in Yiddish. The Welsh-language version was nominated for Best Foreign Language Film at the 72nd Academy Awards.

Plot
In 1911, a young Orthodox Jew named Solomon Levinsky lives with his Yiddish-speaking family in the South Wales Valleys. Solomon peddles fabrics door to door, but hides his ethnicity due to anti-Semitism. One day, Solomon meets a demure, young gentile woman named Gaenor Rees, who he instantly falls in love with. Solomon tells Gaenor his name is Sam Livingstone and that his family is English. Solomon makes Gaenor a red dress and has her try it on. Solomon is struck by how beautiful Gaenor looks and they share their first kiss.

Gaenor's father, Idris, finds the red dress and demands to know who gave it to her. Gaenor introduces Solomon to her family, who are polite, but suspicious of his intentions. Knowing they will never accept him being with a gentile woman, Solomon hides his relationship with Gaenor from his family. Due to the burden of keeping the secret, Solomon begins to struggle with his faith and feels distant from his family. After they are intimate for the first time, Solomon guesses that Gaenor is not a virgin and she reveals she was once engaged to a man, who was severely injured in a mining accident. Gaenor wants to meet Solomon's family, but he claims that his mother is ill and his father is away.

Gaenor's violent brother, Crad, invites Solomon for a drink with his friends and teases him about his profession. Before going to see Gaenor, Solomon always hides his tzitzit in a wall, but this time he is unable to find it. Gaenor becomes frustrated with Solomon's unwillingness to introduce her to his family and tells him she feels like she means nothing to him.

One day in chapel, a fellow worshipper named Noah Jones accuses Gaenor of being pregnant after "fornicating with an outsider." When asked by the Minister to confirm or deny the accusation, Gaenor has to admit in front of the whole congregation that she is pregnant. The Rees family is then expelled from the chapel. Idris tells Gaenor she has to get married or she cannot keep the baby.

Solomon comes to see Gaenor, but her sister, Bronwen, tells him that Gaenor does not want to see him. Solomon hides out near Gaenor's home to get a chance to speak to her, but is beaten up by Crad and his friends, who tell him to never come back. Solomon finally gets to talk to Gaenor and is stunned when he finds out she is pregnant, but Gaenor declares that it is not his business. Solomon finds out his brother, Benjamin, took his tzitzit and when Benjamin asks him if he does not want to be a Jew anymore, Solomon explains that the prayers make everything seem so simple when they are not.

Gaenor tracks down Solomon and confronts him about lying to her about who he is. Solomon explains that his family will not accept her and he would be cast out for being with her. Solomon also admits that even he has struggled to accept her. Gaenor tells him that her family has arranged for her to stay with extended family elsewhere and the baby will be taken away. Gaenor and Solomon begin to see each other again in secret and plan to run away together.

Anti-Semitic feelings rise in the valley due to many people's financial struggles. Crad and his friends plan to ransack the shop owned by the Levinsky family. The family decides to hide elsewhere when they get wind of the plan. That same night, Solomon and Gaenor plan to run away. Solomon sneaks out and is devastated to see his family's business being destroyed. Solomon's father, Isaac, catches up with him and tells him that if he leaves with Gaenor, he will be dead to the family. Solomon reluctantly returns to his family, who have lost everything after the ransacking.

Solomon leaves for Cardiff to work for his uncle to help his family get back on their feet. He writes letters to Gaenor, but they are disposed of by Crad. Gaenor asks Isaac and Solomon's mother, Rezl, where Solomon is, but they decline to tell her. She reminds them she is carrying their grandchild, but they reject the child. Gaenor is sent away to have the baby. Solomon learns from his mother that Gaenor has gone and returns to the valley. He finds Crad, who brutally beats him and refuses to tell him Gaenor's location. Solomon violently attacks Crad and repeatedly demands to know where Gaenor is. Crad tells him Gaenor's location and he sets off to reunite with her.

Solomon treks through the harsh winter to find Gaenor, who is staying with her aunt. When Solomon finally arrives at the home, he is severely ill. Gaenor nurses Solomon, but it is clear it is too late to save him. As Solomon lies dying, he and Gaenor declare their love for each other and Gaenor climbs into bed with him. She awakens the next morning to see that Solomon has died and cries out in grief. Shortly after, Gaenor gives birth to their baby. Along with her father, Gaenor takes Solomon's casket to be buried. They pass by Crad, who climbs on the cart carrying the casket.

Cast 
 Ioan Gruffudd as Solomon Levinsky 
 Nia Roberts as Gaenor Rees 
 Sue Jones-Davies as Gwen Rees
 William Thomas as Idris Rees 
 Mark Lewis Jones as Crad Rees 
 Maureen Lipman as Rezl Levinsky
 David Horovitch as Isaac Levinsky
 Daniel Kaye as Philip Levinsky
 Bethan Ellis Owen as Bronwen Rees
 Elliott Cantor as Benjamin Levinsky
 Steffan Rhodri as Noah Jones
 Aled Phillips as Beautiful Boy in Church

Awards 
 Academy Awards 2000
Best Foreign Language Film - Nominated
Cherbourg-Octeville Festival of Irish & British Film
Best Film (Paul Morrison) - Nominated
Emden International Film Festival
Emden Film Award (Paul Morrison) - 2nd Place
Festróia - Tróia International Film Festival
Golden Dolphin (Paul Morrison) - WON
Verona Love Screens Film Festival
Best Film (Paul Morrison) - WON

References

External links

1999 films
British romance films
Films about Jews and Judaism
Films set in Wales
Films shot in Wales
Interfaith romance films
Welsh films
English-language Welsh films
Welsh-language films
Yiddish-language films
Jewish Welsh history
Cool Cymru
Films set in 1911
Films directed by Paul Morrison (director)
1990s British films